Lot 27 is a township in Prince County, Prince Edward Island, Canada.  It is part of St. David's Parish. Lot 27 was awarded to merchants James Searle and John Russell Spence in the 1767 land lottery.

Communities

Incorporated municipalities:

 Borden-Carleton
 Kinkora

Civic address communities:

 Albany
 Borden-Carleton
 Chelton
 Kinkora
 Maple Plains
 Middleton
 Mount Tryon
 North Carleton
 Searletown
 Shamrock

References

27
Geography of Prince County, Prince Edward Island